Matraville is located in the Eastern Suburbs of Sydney, in the state of New South Wales, Australia.

History
Matraville is named in honour of James Matra (1746–1806), an American sailor and diplomat, who was a midshipman on the voyage by Captain James Cook to Botany Bay in 1770. Matra was born in New York, but later settled in England. Matra had walked over the area with Cook and his close friend, botanist Joseph Banks. Matra had proposed to the British government that it establish a colony at Botany Bay in 1783, and settle dispossessed American Loyalists who had to leave the United States after the American War of Independence. Matra offered to be its 'Conductor and Governor'. The Pitt administration concurred with Matra's proposal but declined to offer him the government of the intended colony. Instead he was given the post of Consul at Tangier, where he remained until his death in 1806.

Landmarks

Landmarks include Heffron Park, a large reserve bordering Maroubra, formerly the site of a naval stores base in World War II.
Eastern Suburbs Memorial Park sits along the southern border of the suburb and incorporates Botany Cemetery, Eastern Suburbs Crematorium and Pioneer Park. Arthur Stace, known in Sydney as Mr Eternity, is buried at Botany Cemetery. He was famous for his practice of writing the word Eternity all over Sydney during the fifties and sixties.

Churches
Matraville is home to St Agnes Catholic Church and Matraville Baptist Church. Matraville also has a large Jehovah's Witness congregation with a Kingdom Hall.

Schools
There are three primary schools, one public and one Catholic and Matraville Sports High School and Matraville Public School. A child care centre and preschool is also in the suburb. Matraville Soldiers Settlement School previously had a separate Infants and Primary School which are now combined into one larger school following the acquisition of park land at Finucane Crescent.

Transport
Sydney Bus routes operate to City – Central Railway station, Martin Place and Circular Quay via Bunnerong Road, Anzac Parade (UNSW), and Oxford Street

Demographics
The median age of the Matraville population was 42 years of age, 2 years above the Australian median. In Matraville, 51.1% of households were made up of couples with children, compared with 37.9% in Randwick City. In Matraville, of all households, 73.8% were family households and 22.8% were single person households. 81.3% of households had at least one person access the internet from the dwelling.

In Matraville, 60% of people were born in Australia. The most common other countries of birth were England 3.5%, China (excludes SARs and Taiwan) 2.5%, New Zealand 2.0%, Indonesia 1.8% and Ireland 1.6%.  Aboriginal and Torres Strait Islander people made up 3.3% of Matraville's population.

The most common occupations in Matraville included Professionals 25.5%, Clerical and Administrative Workers 15.6%, Managers 15.1%, Technicians and Trades Workers 11.7% and Community and Personal Service Workers 10%.Of the employed people in Matraville (State Suburbs), 4.7% worked in Hospitals (except Psychiatric Hospitals). Other major industries of employment included Primary Education 3.0%, Higher Education 2.2%, Computer System Design and Related Service 2.1% and Banking 2.0%.

Notable people

Michael Atherton, Emeritus Professor and composer-performer attended Matraville High School 1965–1966
Bob Carr, Foreign minister of Australia and former Premier of New South Wales. The first dux of Matraville High School in 1964
 Sandor Earl, Rugby league player went to Matraville High
Mark Ella, Glen Ella and Gary Ella Former Australian international rugby-playing brothers
James Tamou, Rugby league player, currently playing for the Wests Tigers in the NRL
 David Warner, Australian international cricketer and a former captain of the Australian national team 
 Mike Whitney AM, former Australian Test cricketer and host of Channel 7's Sydney Weekender

Gallery

References

External links

  [CC-By-SA]
 Satellite Images of Matraville

Suburbs of Sydney
Australian soldier settlements
1904 establishments in Australia
Australian places named after U.S. places or U.S. history